is a station on the Odakyu Odawara line, located in Setagaya, Tokyo and is operated by Odakyu Railway.

Station layout
The station features four tracks and two side platforms. Express trains typically bypass the station on the two innermost tracks while local trains typically stop at the station on the two outermost tracks.

Before tracks were quadrupled on this section of the Odawara Line in 2004, the station featured two tracks and two side platforms.

History 
Station numbering was introduced in 2014 with Umegaoka being assigned station number OH09.

Surroundings
 Hanegi Park
 Kokushikan University

References 

Railway stations in Japan opened in 1934
Odakyu Odawara Line
Railway stations in Tokyo
Stations of Odakyu Electric Railway